The 8mm Gasser is a rimmed cartridge used in the Rast-Gasser M1898 revolver and a small number of converted Mauser C96 pistols. Its bullet is cylindro-ogival and is of the jacketed type.

External links
 8mm Gasser on MUNICION.ORG

Pistol and rifle cartridges